Doctor at Sea is a 1955 British comedy film, directed by Ralph Thomas, produced by Betty E. Box, and based on Richard Gordon's 1953 novel of the same name. This was the second of seven films in the Doctor series, following the hugely popular Doctor in the House from the previous year. Once again, Richard Gordon participated in the screenwriting, together with Nicholas Phipps and Jack Davies, and once again Dirk Bogarde played the lead character Dr Simon Sparrow. The cast also includes James Robertson Justice and Joan Sims from the first film, but this time playing different characters. This was Brigitte Bardot's first English-speaking film.

Plot
To escape his employers' daughter, who has amorous designs on him, Dr. Simon Sparrow (Bogarde) signs on as medical officer on a cargo ship, "SS Lotus". The ship is commanded by the hot-tempered and authoritarian Captain Wentworth Hogg.

Sparrow overcomes initial seasickness and settles into life on board. After arriving in a Brazilian port (a local woman demands two hundred cruzeiros from Sparrow), he meets Hélène Colbert (Bardot), a young French woman who is a nightclub singer.

Captain Hogg is ordered to take on two female passengers, Muriel Mallet (De Banzie), the daughter of the chairman of the shipping company, and her friend Hélène for the return trip. The unmarried Hogg is pursued by Muriel, who, having her father's ear, promises him almost certain promotion to the rank of commodore within the company if he were to marry her.

Romance blossoms between Sparrow and Hélène, but she declines his tentative marriage proposal. However, as they reach home port, Sparrow finds out that she has received a telegram offering her a job in Rio de Janeiro, which he had told her is the destination for his ship on its next trip. The film ends as they embrace and kiss.

Main cast

 Dirk Bogarde as Dr. Simon Sparrow
 James Robertson Justice as Captain Hogg
 Brenda De Banzie as Muriel Mallet
 Brigitte Bardot as Hélène Colbert
 Maurice Denham as Steward Easter
 Michael Medwin as Third Officer Trail
 Hubert Gregg as Second Officer Archer
 James Kenney as Fellowes
 Raymond Huntley as Capt. Beamish
 Geoffrey Keen as Chief Officer Hornbeam 
 George Coulouris as Ship's Carpenter 
 Noel Purcell as Corbie 
 Jill Adams as Jill 
 Joan Sims as Wendy
 Cyril Chamberlain as Whimble
 Toke Townley as Jenkins 
 Thomas Heathcote as Wilson
 Eugene Deckers as Chief of Police
 Michael Shepley as Jill's father
 Felix Felton as Dr George Thomas

Reception
The film was the third most popular movie at the British box office in 1955, after The Dam Busters and White Christmas.

Thomas claimed in 1956 that it made half a million pounds profit.

Critical
Variety accused Rank studios of playing safe, writing that "Doctor at Sea does not rise to the same laugh-provoking heights as its predecessor". The Radio Times also found it "short on truly comic incident, and the shipboard location is limiting", but Allmovie wrote, "Often funnier than its predecessor, Doctor at Sea proved the viability of the "Doctor" series."

Awards
Nominated, 1956 BAFTA Film Award, Best British Screenplay, Nicholas Phipps and Jack Davies.

Sequels

This was the second installment of the Doctor series of films, with Bogarde featuring in the first three.

References

External links

Doctor at Sea at Britmovie

1955 films
1955 comedy films
British comedy films
Doctor in the House
Films directed by Ralph Thomas
Films shot at Pinewood Studios
Seafaring films
British sequel films
Films produced by Betty Box
Films based on British novels
1950s English-language films
1950s British films